Hongshulin (formerly transliterated as Hung Shulin Station until 2003) is a metro and light rail station in New Taipei, Taiwan, operated by Taipei and New Taipei Metro respectively. The location of station could be traced back the station of the same name on the now-defunct Tamsui railway line.

The station is a terminus for the Danhai light rail serving Danhai New Town.

Station overview

The at-grade, station structure with two side platforms and two exits. The washrooms are inside the entrance area.

The station is situated on the east of Zhongzheng West Road, around Bashe Road entrance. The name of the station derives from the protected habitat "Hongshulin" (literally "red forest", means Mangrove), the Hongshulin environmental protection zone is located west of the station.

Station layout

References

Tamsui–Xinyi line stations
Railway stations opened in 1997
Danhai light rail stations